Chieftain Products was a Canada-based toy & game company which released games such as Scrabble, Atmosfear, etc. Founded in 1972 by Edward J. Scott in Toronto, Ontario, this toy company was closed down in 1996 after the release of Atmosfear 4. It moved in 1980 to North York, Ontario.

Products
True Dough Mania (1982)
Scrabble (1984)
Atmosfear (1991-1996)
paint and coloring books
crayons
pencils
pens
brushes and other applicators
children's books
games
cross-word and jigsaw puzzles
dolls
doll houses
doll furniture
doll clothing
hobby and craft sets 
replica model kits
toy construction kits
hamburger game
Corking Set Tricotin knitting toy

References

Sources
Virtual Museum of Canada: Photograph of toy oven from Chieftain Products
Rules for the game of Amnesia from Chieftain Products, including the company's Downsview address
Nightmare/Atmosfear Homepage FAQ
"Canadian firms take on Coleco (Avanti Productions Ltd; Chieftain Products Inc)." The Financial Post 82.6 (Feb 6, 1988): 9. CPI.Q (Canadian Periodicals). Thomson Gale. TORONTO PUBLIC LIBRARIES (CELPLO). 10 Oct. 2006
  Wickstrom, Andy. "Will this nightmare be a sweet dream for video stores? (Chieftain Inc.'s video board game, 'Nightmare')." Video Business 12.n29 (August 14, 1992): 38(1). General Reference Center Gold. Thomson Gale. TORONTO PUBLIC LIBRARIES (CELPLO). 10 Oct. 2006

Defunct companies of Ontario
Defunct toy manufacturers
Toy companies of Canada
Board game publishing companies